Everything and More is the third album of Natalia, Belgium's highest selling female artist. The release date was May 28, 2007 in Belgium. The album was recorded in Berlin.

The first single from the album was "Gone to Stay", released on May 14, 2007. One of the songs on the album, I Will, has been written by Pink for Natalia. The album turned platinum after one day of sales.

Natalia broke a record with this album, on the 15th of June 2007, there were 10 different songs of the album in Belgian top 100 charts thanks to iTunes download sales.

The second single of the album was Glamorous together with En Vogue, Natalia re-recorded the Glamorous song from her Album with En Vogue as a promotion for the 6 sold-out "Natalia meets En Vogue feat. Shaggy" concerts in January 2008, 75.000 tickets were sold.

Track listing
Standard for all:
01."I Was Born"
02."Gone to Stay"
03."I Survived You"
04."Like a Lady"
05."Kind of Love"
06."Everything & More"
07."Lil' Precious"
08."Paper Rain"
09."Appetite for Love"
10."Let It Ride"
11."I Got You"
12."I Will"
13."Glamorous"
14."Unexpected"

Bonus tracks

Free Record Shop edition:
15."Drop a Little" (album version)

iTunes edition:
15."I'll Be Here"

Re-release July 2008:
"Drop a Little" (single version)
"Where She Belongs" (theme song of 'Sara')
"All That I Am" (an unreleased track)

Charts

Singles
"Gone to Stay" (2007-05-14)
"Glamorous/Where She Belongs"° (2007-10-29)
"I Survived You" (2008-02-22)
"Drop a Little"

°New version with En Vogue

Tour
On 21 and 22 April 2007 Natalia will give the kick-off concerts of her Everything and More tour in Antwerp.

External links
Natalia at My Space
Natalia meets...
Natalia's official website

2007 albums
Natalia (Belgian singer) albums
Sony BMG albums